Leptoancistrus is a genus of armored catfishes native to Colombia and Panama.

Species
There are currently two recognized species in this genus:
 Leptoancistrus canensis (Meek & Hildebrand, 1913)
 Leptoancistrus cordobensis Dahl, 1964

References

Loricariidae
Fish of Central America
Fish of South America
Catfish genera
Taxa named by Seth Eugene Meek
Taxa named by Samuel Frederick Hildebrand
Freshwater fish genera